William Robertson Warren (October 9, 1879 – December 31, 1927) was a Newfoundland lawyer, politician and judge who served as the dominion's Prime Minister from July 1923 to April 1924.

Early life
His parents were William Matthew Henry Warren, a surveyor, and Jessie Sophia Warren. He had at least one sibling, a sister, Alice Mary Warren (died 1930), who was married to Robert Brown Job, President of  Job Brothers & Co., Limited.

He received his education at Bishop Feild College, St. John's, Newfoundland and Framlingham College, in England. After studying law, Warren was admitted as a solicitor in 1901

Career
Warren was first elected to the Newfoundland House of Assembly in 1903 as a Liberal and served as Speaker of the House from 1909-1913. In 1919 he became minister of justice in the Cabinet of Sir Richard Squires.  The Squires government became embroiled in a scandal over allegations of corruption and misspending of government funds and Squires resigned in protest along with three other ministers in 1923. The next year Squires was forced to resign and Warren was chosen the party's new leader and Prime Minister. His government launched a formal inquiry into the corruption charges which resulted in the arrest and conviction of Squires and several others. Warren's supporters turned against him and moved a Motion of No Confidence that defeated his government. Warren moved to the opposition benches and formed a coalition with Tory William J. Higgins to form the new Liberal-Conservative Progressive Party that won the election a few weeks later making the conservative Walter Stanley Monroe the new Prime Minister.

In 1926, Warren resigned from the House of Assembly and was appointed to the colony's Supreme Court.

Personal life
He was married first to Ethel Alice Gordon, by whom he had one son, John Henry Warren, and two daughters.  He was married secondly to Emilie Jackson (died 1934) by whom he had one daughter.

Warren died in 1927.

References

External links

Newfoundland in the 1920s

1879 births
1927 deaths
Prime Ministers of the Dominion of Newfoundland
Speakers of the Newfoundland and Labrador House of Assembly
Judges in Newfoundland and Labrador
Monumental masons
Bishop Feild School alumni
People educated at Framlingham College
20th-century sculptors
Dominion of Newfoundland politicians